George Makdisi, (1920-2002),  professor of oriental studies
Jean Said Makdisi, (1940-), Palestinian writer and scholar
Saree Makdisi, (1964-), literary critic and professor, son of the above
Wadad Makdisi Cortas, (1909 — 1979), educator and memoirist